The Hippy Nuts are an American rock band in New York City, New York.

Singer Kathena Bryant (from Greenville, Texas) and guitarist/producer Tim Champion (from Seattle, Washington) began collaborating in 1993. By 1995, they were performing as a duo in downtown Manhattan venues like the Cottonwood Cafe, Cowgirl Hall of Fame, and The Bottom Line. They added a full band and adopted the name The Hippy Nuts in 1996. Champion produced Bryant's solo album, Highway, in 1998, followed by The Hippy Nuts albums Hardcore Mellowdriven (2004) and Before the Fall of Onions or Tales... (2007). The latter received positive reviews, including a nod from the Village Voice Pazz & Jop Awards in 2008. The Hippy Nuts perform regularly around Manhattan, often at Banjo Jim's on the Lower East Side.

The Hippy Nuts have worked with a number of notable artists. Tony Award winner Alice Ripley has contributed background vocals on several Hippy Nuts tracks, including "I Feel Lucky Tonight". Noted photographer Ben Glass directed the Nuts' music video for "Sometimes a Feeling", and independent filmmaker Frank Keraudren directed "Working for Love" and "Beulah Land".

In January 2012, The Hippy Nuts commenced their Southern Immersion Tour in support of their third studio album, I Feel Lucky Tonight (2012); the tour included dates in Memphis, Dallas-Ft. Worth, and Jonesboro, Arkansas, and ended in New York, New York. On July 28, 2012, they played the Rock Out for Radical Radio show hosted by WFTE 105.7 FM in Scranton, Pennsylvania. "I Feel Lucky Tonight" earned  positive reviews from The Daily News (PA) WeHeartMusic.com, which described the record as having "a lot of soul" and praised guitarist Champion's sound as "jazz and soul distortion" that has been "perfected".

Tim Champion Guitar Pedals
Tim Champion has received accolades for his handmade guitar pedals. Both his Fuzzar-o and Hissy Foot pedals were recognized as "Best of 2008" by Premier Guitar magazine.

Discography
Highway (1998)
Hardcore Mellowdriven (2004)
Before the Fall of Onions or Tales... (2007)
I Feel Lucky Tonight (2012)

References

External links
 Official Site
 The Hippy Nuts Myspace Page

Musical groups established in 1995
Musical groups from New York City
Rock music groups from New York (state)